TCV or T.C.V. may refer to:

 TCV (album), an album of The Click Five, an American power pop band
 TCV (investment firm) (Technology Crossover Ventures), an American venture capital firm based in Menlo Park, California
 Temperature control valve
 Terminus Centre-Ville, a public transit hub in Montreal, Quebec, Canada
 The Conservation Volunteers, a British environmental charity
 Them Crooked Vultures, a supergroup
 Tibetan Children's Villages, an Indian charity for the care and education of children from Tibet
 Timecode Vinyl, as used with vinyl emulation software
 Today's Chinese Version, a translation of the Bible
 Tokamak à configuration variable, a research nuclear fusion reactor in Lausanne, Switzerland
 Total Contract Value, a measurement used in project management
 Turnip crinkle virus, a species of virus